The discography of Beastie Boys, an American hip hop group, consists of eight studio albums, four compilation albums, five video albums, seven extended plays, 40 singles and 44 music videos.

The group, formed in 1981, consisted of rappers Adam "MCA" Yauch (vocals, bass), Michael "Mike D" Diamond (vocals, drums), Adam "Ad-Rock" Horovitz (vocals, guitars), and Kate Schellenbach (drums), originally accompanied by DJ Hurricane and later accompanied by turntablist Mix Master Mike. Originally a hardcore punk group, the group's first release, Polly Wog Stew, was released in November 1982. The band made the shift into hip hop music with the single "Cooky Puss" (1983).  They later signed to Def Jam Recordings, releasing "Rock Hard" in 1984.  Around this time, Kate Schellenbach left the group.  Since 1986, the group has released eight studio albums, four of which have topped the US Billboard 200 chart. Beastie Boys have sold 20,384,000 albums in the US as of July 2013.

Albums

Studio albums

Compilation albums

Video albums

Extended plays

Singles

As lead artist

As featured artist

Music videos

As lead artist

As featured artist

Notes

A  "Girls" was released as a double A-side single with "She's Crafty" in the United Kingdom.
B  An EP entitled Love American Style, containing a track listing similar to that of the "Hey Ladies" single, was released in several territories in place of the single. The UK peak chart position listed for "Hey Ladies" represents the peak chart position of Love American Style.
C  "Shadrach" was alternately released as a single under the name "An Exciting Evening at Home with Shadrach, Meshach and Abednego". 
D  "So What'cha Want" did not enter the R&B/Hip-Hop Songs chart, but peaked at number 21 on the Bubbling Under R&B/Hip-Hop Singles chart, which acts as an extension to the R&B/Hip-Hop Songs chart.
E  An EP entitled Frozen Metal Head, containing a track listing similar to that of the "Jimmy James" single, was released in several territories in place of the single. The UK peak chart position listed for "Jimmy James" represents the peak chart position of Frozen Metal Head.
F  "Sabotage" did not enter the Billboard Hot 100, but peaked at number 15 on the Bubbling Under Hot 100 Singles chart, which acts as an extension to the Hot 100.
G   "Sabotage" and "Get It Together" were released together as a double A-side single in several European territories.
H  "Get It Together" did not enter the Billboard Hot 100, but peaked at number 1 on the Bubbling Under Hot 100 Singles chart, which acts as an extension to the Hot 100. It did not enter the R&B/Hip-Hop Songs chart, but peaked at number 6 on the Bubbling Under R&B/Hip-Hop Singles chart, which acts as an extension to the R&B/Hip-Hop Songs chart.
I  "Ch-Check It Out" did not enter the R&B/Hip-Hop Songs chart, but peaked at number 6 on the Bubbling Under R&B/Hip-Hop Singles chart, which acts as an extension to the R&B/Hip-Hop Songs chart.
J  "Make Some Noise" did not enter the Billboard Hot 100, but peaked at number 2 on the Bubbling Under Hot 100 Singles chart, which acts as an extension to the Hot 100.

References

External links
 Official website
 
 
 

Discography
Rap rock discographies
Discographies of American artists
Punk rock group discographies